The First Congregational Church of Marion is a historic church at 601 Clay Street in Marion, Alabama.  It was built in 1871 after the congregation was established in 1869 by freed slaves and the American Missionary Association. The congregation later became affiliated with the United Church of Christ in the 1950s. The building was added to the National Register of Historic Places in 1982. Idella Jones Childs was one of the people who helped get the building listed on the register.

See also
Historical Marker Database

References

Churches on the National Register of Historic Places in Alabama
National Register of Historic Places in Perry County, Alabama
Churches completed in 1871
Churches in Perry County, Alabama
United Church of Christ churches in Alabama
Marion, Alabama